The Changsha dialect is a dialect of New Xiang Chinese. It is spoken predominantly in Changsha, the capital of Hunan province, China. It is not mutually intelligible with Standard Mandarin, the official language of China.

Classification

The Changsha dialect is what Chinese dialectologists would call a New Xiang variety, as opposed to Old Xiang; the distinction is mainly based on the presence of the Middle Chinese voiced plosives and affricates. The Old Xiang varieties, being more conservative, have in general kept them while the New Xiang ones have altogether lost them and changed them to voiceless unaspirated consonants. Although most Chinese dialectologists treat New Xiang as part of the group, Zhou Zhenhe and You Rujie classify it as Southwestern Mandarin.

Geographic distribution

The Changsha dialect is spoken in the city of Changsha and its neighbouring suburbs. However, there are some slight differences between the urban and suburban speech. For instance, the retroflex set is only heard in the suburbs, but not in the city. Further, some words have a different final in the two varieties.

Dialects

There are no substantial differences between dialects in the neighbourhoods of Changsha; however, age dialects do exist. For example, the distinction between alveolar and alveolo-palatal consonants is only made by the elderly while the younger generations do not normally distinguish them.

Phonetics and phonology

The Changsha dialect, together with other New Xiang varieties, has lost the Middle Chinese obstruents, which are changed to voiceless unaspirated consonants. It has also lost all the final plosives found in the rù tone in Middle Chinese.

Consonants

Vowels

Tones

Changsha has 6 tones, which are neutralized in syllables ending in a stop.

See also

 List of Chinese dialects

References

 Běijīng dàxué zhōngguóyǔyánwénxuéxì yǔyánxué jiàoyánshì (1989). Hànyǔ fāngyīn zìhuì. Běijīng: Wénzì gǎigé chūbǎnshè. (北京大學中國語言文學系語言學教研室. 1989. 漢語方音字匯. 北京: 文字改革出版社)
 Norman, Jerry (2002) [1988]. Chinese. Cambridge, England: CUP 
 Wu, Yunji (2005). A Synchronic and diachronic study of the grammar of the Chinese Xiang dialects. Berlin, New York: Mouton de Gruyter. 
 Yuan, Jiahua (1989). Hànyǔ fāngyán gàiyào (An introduction to Chinese regional speech varieties). Beijing, China: Wénzì gǎigé chūbǎnshè. (袁家驊. 1989. 漢語方言概要. 北京:文字改革出版社.)

External links
 Cantonese and other dialects (in Chinese)
 Classification of Xiang Dialects from Glossika

Xiang Chinese